Marcenaro is a surname. Notable people with the surname include:

Carlos Marcenaro (1912–1988), Peruvian middle-distance runner
Nelson Marcenaro (1952–2021), Uruguayan footballer
Pietro Marcenaro (born 1946), Italian politician and trade unionist 
Roland Marcenaro (born 1963), Uruguayan football manager and former player